Nast Hyde Halt is a disused railway station in Hertfordshire. It was opened in 1910 to serve the new houses being built in the area. It is also said that a local householder, Oliver Bury, asked for the halt to be opened in order that he could use the line to commute to Kings Cross.

External links
 Nast Hyde Halt at Disused-Stations.org.uk

Disused railway stations in Hertfordshire
Former Great Northern Railway stations
Railway stations in Great Britain opened in 1910
Railway stations in Great Britain closed in 1951